Vila Sônia is a district in the city of São Paulo, Brazil, it will be the terminal of Line 4.

Districts of São Paulo